Pavel Dmitriyevich Komolov (born 10 March 1989) is a Russian former footballer. His positions were right winger, left midfielder and central midfielder.

Career

Club
In January 2011, he was loaned to GKS Bełchatów from Žalgiris Vilnius on a half-year deal. He returned half year later. Three years later, he was loaned to Veria, after that he returned to Žalgiris Vilnius but then he was loaned again to GKS Bełchatów on a half-year deal.

He made his Russian Premier League debut for FC Amkar Perm on 20 July 2015 in a game against FC Krasnodar.

On 14 June 2018, he signed a two-year contract with FC Yenisey Krasnoyarsk.

International
He was a part of Russia national under-20 football team.

Career statistics

Club

Notes

References

External links
 

1989 births
Footballers from Saint Petersburg
Living people
Russian footballers
Russia youth international footballers
GKS Bełchatów players
FK Žalgiris players
A Lyga players
Russian expatriate footballers
Expatriate footballers in Lithuania
Expatriate footballers in Poland
Expatriate footballers in Greece
Russian expatriate sportspeople in Lithuania
Russian expatriate sportspeople in Poland
Russian expatriate sportspeople in Greece
Veria F.C. players
FC Amkar Perm players
Russian Premier League players
Super League Greece players
Association football midfielders
FC Zenit Saint Petersburg players
FC Yenisey Krasnoyarsk players
FC Nizhny Novgorod (2015) players